Miljenko Matijevic (born November 30, 1964) is a Croatian-American singer, best known as the lead vocalist and songwriter of the rock band Steelheart. He has a big following in South Korea and has worked on several South Korean TV series. He has also released several soundtracks for South Korean TV series. In 2010, he did a tour with Ray Manzarek and Robby Krieger of rock band the Doors, singing the parts of the late Jim Morrison.

Early life 
Matijevic was born in Zagreb in 1964. He lived there with his brother and grandparents until 1970 when his parents collected him from Croatia and moved with him and his brother to Scarsdale, New York. When Matijevic was 7, the family moved to Greenwich, Connecticut. Michael's brother, John, learned to play the guitar and Michael would often sing along, particularly country music, as that is what their father enjoyed. When Michael was 9 he joined the local church choir. However, the biggest change was when Michael was 11 and discovered Led Zeppelin.

Career 
After being seen playing at a local club in the band The Mission, Don Stroh, owner of Showcase Studios, called Matijevic saying he should come in and rehearse with a band in his studio. This is where Matijevic first met Chris Risola and James Ward, along with Jack Wilkinson, and Red Alert was formed.

Jack Wilkinson was eventually replaced by John Fowler on drums and Frank DiConstanzo (formerly of Rage of Angels) was added as a rhythm guitarist. Michael soon devoted all attention to the band, and not his college work. He, John and James left for Los Angeles in the hope of getting a record deal, despite having no contacts. However, within a month, the band had a record deal.

Their first album, Steelheart, released in 1990, sold over a million copies and was supported by a world tour. The follow-up, Tangled in Reins, released in 1992, was supported by a tour in Europe and Asia.

At the end of their U.S. tour in 1992 opening for Great White, Steelheart was invited to open an additional show for the band Slaughter. On Halloween night, at the McNichols Arena in Denver, Colorado, Steelheart was performing "Dancing in the Fire" from the Tangled in Reins album when Matijevic was involved in a serious accident. Matijevic decided to climb a lighting truss which was for some reason improperly secured. He failed to climb the rig and also failed to dodge the 1000 pound piece of equipment, which hit him in the back of the head, driving him face first into the stage. The outcome of the accident was a broken nose, cheekbone, jaw, twisted spine, and severe memory loss. Matijevic found the strength to walk off the stage and was immediately taken to the hospital. The incident marked the end of the original lineup of Steelheart.

Steelheart reformed with a new lineup and released the album, Wait, in 1996. The band released the album Good 2B Alive in 2008.  In 2010, Michael did a tour with Ray Manzarek and Robby Krieger of rock band The Doors, singing the parts of the late Jim Morrison.

Steelheart released the album, Through Worlds of Stardust, in 2017 and the live album, Rock'n Milan, in 2018.

Discography

Steelheart

South Korean singles

Filmography

Television series

Film appearance

References

External links 

 
 
 

1964 births
Living people
20th-century Croatian male singers
Croatian singer-songwriters
Croatian record producers
21st-century American male singers
21st-century American singers
American heavy metal singers
American singer-songwriters
American record producers
Yugoslav emigrants to the United States
Musicians from Zagreb
Steelheart